The mayoral election of New Orleans, Louisiana for 1866 was won by John T. Monroe. This election and later actions by Mayor Monroe against black suffragists would result in the New Orleans massacre of 1866.

Results

References

1866 Louisiana elections
1866
New Orleans
19th century in New Orleans